Johann Joseph Eugene von Guérard (17 November 181117 April 1901) was an Austrian-born artist, active in Australia from 1852 until 1882. Known for his finely detailed landscapes in the tradition of the Düsseldorf school of painting, he is represented in Australia's major public galleries, and is referred to in the country as Eugene von Guerard.

Early life
Born in Vienna, Austria, von Guerard toured Italy with his father (a painter of miniatures at the court of Emperor Francis I of Austria) from 1826, and between 1830 and 1832 resided in Rome, where he became involved with a number of German artists. Von Guerard's personal artistic style was formed by his first teacher, his miniaturist father with whom he travelled throughout Italy. Other influences ascribed to von Guerard are Claude Lorrain, Nicolas Poussin and Salvator Rosa. During his studies at the Düsseldorf Academy he absorbed the new criterion for German art promoted by his landscape lecturer Johann Wilhelm Schirmer under the directorship of ex-Nazarenes member Wilhelm von Schadow: to present "elevated" subject matter in the style of a new "truthful"' realism. The Düsseldorf style of painting combined concepts of prevailing trends: Historicism, a lingering Romanticism and a new visually based Realism that required taking observations from nature. Von Guerard's Australian landscapes show his sensitive perception of the Australian landscape, whilst his stylistic methodology exemplifies the confluence of various styles derived from his European artistic heritage.

Australia
In 1852 von Guerard arrived in Victoria, Australia, determined to try his luck on the Victorian goldfields. As a gold-digger he was unsuccessful, but he did produce a large number of intimate studies of goldfields life, quite different from the deliberately awe-inspiring landscapes for which he was later to become famous.

He was one of a number of influential German-speaking residents  such as William Blandowski, Ludwig Becker, Hermann Beckler, Amalie Dietrich, Diedrich Henne, Gerard Krefft, Johann Luehmann, Johann Menge, Ludwig Preiss, Carl Ludwig Christian Rümker (a.k.a. Ruemker), Moritz Richard Schomburgk, Richard Wolfgang Semon, George Ulrich, Robert von Lendenfeld, Ferdinand von Mueller, Georg von Neumayer, and Carl Wilhelmi  who brought their "epistemic traditions" to Australia, and not only became "deeply entangled with the Australian colonial project", but also "intricately involved in imagining, knowing and shaping colonial Australia" (Barrett, et al., 2018, p.2).

By the early 1860s von Guerard was recognised as the foremost landscape artist in the colonies, touring Southeast Australia and New Zealand in pursuit of the sublime and the picturesque. He is most known for the wilderness paintings produced during this time, which are remarkable for their shadowy lighting and fastidious detail. Indeed, his view of Tower Hill in south-western Victoria was used as a botanical template over a century later when the land, which had been laid waste and polluted by agriculture, was systematically reclaimed, forested with native flora and made a state park. The scientific accuracy of such work has led to a reassessment of von Guerard's approach to wilderness painting, and some historians believe it likely that the landscapist was strongly influenced by the environmental theories of the leading scientist Alexander von Humboldt. Others attribute his 'truthful representation' of nature to the criterion for figure and landscape painting set by the Düsseldorf Academy.

In 1866 his Valley of the Mitta Mitta was presented to the National Gallery of Victoria in Melbourne; in 1870 the trustees purchased his Mount Kosciusko. In 2006, the City of Greater Geelong purchased his 1856 painting View of Geelong for A$3.8M. His painting, Yalla-y-Poora, is in the Joseph Brown Collection on display at the National Gallery of Victoria. In 2018 another painting, Stoneleigh, Beaufort near Ararat, Victoria (1866) was put on permanent display in the Galleries of the State Library of New South Wales.

Von Guerard's paintings were also purchased by the Art Gallery of New South Wales including Waterfall, Strath Creek (1862), Sydney Heads (1865) and Milford Sound, New Zealand (1877–1879) among many others.

The State Library of New South Wales in Sydney holds 32 sketchbooks which cover von Guerard’s twenty-eight years in Australia and also the period of his early travels in the Rhineland and Italy and his return to Europe after 1881. The drawings include pencil sketches, detailed pen and ink or pencil drawings, and a few with colour added and include works done on scientific expeditions with Alfred William Howitt and Georg von Neumayer, the meteorologist. The sketchbooks cover Italy and Germany, 1835–1852, Australia, 1854–1891, and the English sketchbook, 1891–1900.

The only known copy of von Guerard's 1852–1854 diary of his time on the goldfields is held in England. But a typescript translation made from the original German is held in the State Library of New South Wales. This translation has been digitised and can be viewed online. It consists of one volume of bound extracts from von Guerard's journal, 18 August 1852 – 16 March 1854, with ten original ink illustrations pasted onto leaves at end of volume. Extracts cover his departure from Gravesend England on board the Windermere and the voyage out to Melbourne, his stay at the Eureka and Ballarat goldfields and his departure to Geelong. The translation may have been made by his daughter, Victoria, who was born in Australia and married an Englishman. For a short time, he lived in Daylesford and created several paintings of the area.

In 1870 von Guerard was appointed the first Master of the School of Painting at the National Gallery of Victoria, where he was to influence the training of artists for the next 11 years. His reputation, high at the beginning of this period, had faded somewhat towards the end because of his rigid adherence to picturesque subject matter and detailed treatment in the face of the rise of the more intimate Heidelberg School style. Amongst his pupils were Frederick McCubbin and Tom Roberts. Von Guerard retired from his position at the National Gallery School the end of 1881 and departed for Europe in January 1882. In 1891 his wife died. Two years later, he lost his investments in the Australian bank crash and he lived in poverty until his death in Chelsea, London, on 17 April 1901.

Publications
 Eugen von Guerard's Australian landscapes, a series of 24 tinted lithographs [...] drawn from nature and lithographed by the artist, with letter press descriptive of each view (Melbourne: Hamel & Ferguson, 1867).
 Ruth Pullin, "The Vulkaneifel and Victoria's Western District: Eugène von Guérard and the Geognostic Landscape", in David R. Marshall, Melbourne Art Journal, nos 11–12, 2010.
 Von Guérard, E., & Tipping, M. (1975). Eugène von Guérard's Australian landscapes / [Text by] Marjorie Tipping; with a preface by Joseph Burke. (1st ed.). Melbourne: Lansdowne Press, reference online
 Pullin, R., Clegg, H., Varcoe-Cocks, M., and National Gallery of Victoria. Council of Trustees. (2011). Eugene von Guérard: Nature Revealed, Ruth Pullin. (1st ed.). Melbourne: Council of Trustees of the National Gallery of Victoria
 "Eugene von Guérard: Nature Revealed" , Ian Potter Centre: NGV Australia exhibition, 16 April–7 August 2011
 Bruce, Candice; Art Gallery of New South Wales, and Australian Gallery Directors Council. (1980). Eugen von Guérard, with an introduction by Daniel Thomas. Sydney: Australian Gallery Directors Council in conjunction with the Australian National Gallery

Explanatory notes

References

Further reading
 Barrett, L., Eckstein, L., Hurley, A.W. & Schwarz A. (2018), "Remembering German-Australian Colonial Entanglement: An Introduction", Postcolonial Studies, Vol.21, No.1, (January 2018), pp.1-5. 
 Candice Bruce, "Eugen von Guérard", AGDC & ANG exhibition catalogue, 1980. 
 Candice Bruce, Edward Comstock and Frank McDonald, Eugene von Guerard, 1811–1901: A German Romantic in the Antipodes, Martinborough, NZ, 1982. .
 "Eugène von Guérard" by Candice Bruce and Edward Comstock, Dictionary of Australian Artists, Oxford University Press, 1992, pp. 330–332.

External links

 Culture Victoria – images and text about the Eugene von Guerard
 Eugene von Guérard at the Art Gallery of New South Wales
 Collection of Fifty Drawings, 1855–1875, by Eugene Von Guerard, presented by Sir William Dixson to the State Library of New South Wales in 1951.
 Eugene von Guerard 32 sketchbooks, 1835–1900, including sketches drawn in Italy and Germany, 1835–1852; Australia 1854–1891; Europe and England, 1891–1900, purchased by the State Library of New South Wales in 1970, 1975 and 1998.
 "Eugene von Guerard in Illawarra: A Micro-Historical Study of his Portrait of Blanche & Agnes Gordon and his Masterpiece Landscapes of American Creek and Lake Illawarra" by Joseph L. Davis

1811 births
1901 deaths
Austrian emigrants to Australia
Artists from Vienna
Kunstakademie Düsseldorf alumni
19th-century Australian painters
19th-century Austrian male artists
Australian male painters
Düsseldorf school of painting